Kwu Tung is an area in the northern New Territories, west of Sheung Shui and Fanling, and east of Lok Ma Chau and San Tin, in Hong Kong.

Administration
For electoral purposes, Kwu Tung is part of the Sheung Shui Rural constituency of the North District Council. It is currently represented by Simon Hau Fuk-tat, who was elected in the local elections.

History
Kwu Tung literally means "old cave" in the Cantonese language. Tung (洞 or 峒) also indicates that it was the habitat of ancient native Cantonese people. These inhabitants were later replaced by Punti, Hakka, and a small number of Teochew people, and the newcomers became the indigenous inhabitants of Hong Kong. Residents in Kwu Tung are mainly farmers.

Geography
With the sediment of Sheung Yue River and creeks nearby, the land of Kwu Tung is relatively plain compared to the rest of hilly Hong Kong.

Development
Kwu Tung North is one of three new development areas currently being planned for North District, in parallel with Fanling North and Ta Kwu Ling.
According to the Railway Development Strategy 2014, a shuttle service between Kwu Tung Station and Kam Sheung Road Station spanning 10.7 km (6.6 mi) is expected to begin construction within 2019 to 2023. Kwu Tung resident away by paying the HKD$60,0000 per house

See also
 Kwu Tung station
 Oi Yuen Villa

References

External links

 Delineation of area of existing village Kwu Tung (North) (Sheung Shui) for election of resident representative (2019 to 2022)
 Delineation of area of existing village Kwu Tung (South) (Sheung Shui) for election of resident representative (2019 to 2022)